Huckaback fabric or Huck is a type of toweling cloth with a bird's eye or honeycomb pattern. It is a loosely woven fabric made of cotton or linen with Huckaback weave.

Structure 
The fabric has small geometric patterns and extra texture. It has a plain, rough pebbled surface.

Huckaback 
Blended Huck towels are made by keeping warp in cotton and weft in linen. Huckaback is a weave in which the weft yarns are of a relatively lower count, and they are loosely twisted (softly spun), making a floating and absorbing weave. It is woven on a dobby loom that has a mechanism for weaving geometric patterns.  The Huck cloth has good absorbency hence suitable for towels.

Swedish weave 
Huck weave is also called Swedish weave that was famous in 1940.

Use 
Terry, the piled fabrics, and Huck are preferred cloths for towels.

See also 

 Crash (fabric)
 Dobby (cloth)
 Honeycomb structure
 Towel

References 

Woven fabrics